Government Higher Secondary School Sreekandapuram is located in Sreekandapuram, Kannur, Kerala, India, and affiliated to the Kerala State Education Board. There are around 1,000 students and 80+ teaching staff. The school offers Science, Humanities and Commerce streams in higher secondary level.

References

High schools and secondary schools in Kerala
Schools in Kannur district